Dakota Bradley (born in St. Louis, Missouri) was the stage name of American pop rock singer and songwriter, Lenny Pey.

Career
After a fire destroyed his home in 2009, Bradley moved to Nashville, Tennessee to pursue a career in music. He gained internet fame when he and CJ Holland recorded "The Girl Is Mine"; a video of which on YouTube went viral and led to an appearance on The Ellen DeGeneres Show in 2010. In 2011, Bradley wrote "All of My Tomorrows" with Colt Ford, which was released on Ford's 2012 Declaration of Independence album. The song topped the charts and Dakota received a Billboard Number One Award.

In 2012, Bradley signed with Streamsound Records, a label founded by Byron Gallimore and Jim Wilkes. Bradley's debut album was produced by Byron Gallimore and Tim McGraw. Bradley's debut single, "Somethin' Like Somethin'", was released on May 14, 2013 and reached number 53 on the Billboard Country Airplay chart. In August 2013, Bradley opened for McGraw in Phoenix, Arizona during the Two Lanes of Freedom Tour. Later that month he released an exclusive track, "Memory or Me", to Glamour.com. He also released a special track, "Wild Child", on SiriusXM The Highway in November 2013. Shortly after, Streamsound Records closed and Bradley became an independent artist.

Bradley's second single, which he co-wrote, is called "Won't Be Young Forever" and was released in April 2014.

Singles

References

External links 
 

American country singer-songwriters
American male singer-songwriters
Country musicians from Missouri
Living people
Streamsound Records artists
Musicians from St. Louis
Musicians from Nashville, Tennessee
Year of birth missing (living people)
Singer-songwriters from Tennessee
Singer-songwriters from Missouri
Country musicians from Tennessee